George Otto Emil Lignac (30 August 1891 – 5 September 1954) was a Dutch pathologist-anatomist.

Lignac was born in Passoeroean, Java, Dutch East Indies, where his father worked as a civil servant. He studied medicine at Leiden and then returned to the Dutch East Indies and was a teacher at the STOVIA (School tot Opleiding van Indische Artsen or "school for the training of Indian physicians") in Batavia.

He returned to the Netherlands and was appointed professor of pathology, general diseases, pathological anatomy, and juridical medicine in Leiden in 1934.

He published work on skin pigmentation, cysteine metabolism and the carcinogenic nature of benzol and many more.

The Abderhalden–Kaufmann–Lignac syndrome is named for Emil Abderhalden, Eduard Kaufmann and George Lignac. Renal Fanconi syndrome has sometimes been called Lignac–Fanconi syndrome, as Lignac contributed to the study of it.

Lignac died in a plane crash in the river Shannon (Ireland) in 1954.

References
 B.G. Firkin & J.A.Whitworth (1987). Dictionary of Medical Eponyms. Parthenon Publishing. 
 Who Named It?

1891 births
1954 deaths
Dutch people of the Dutch East Indies